The Brown University School of Public Health is the public health school of Brown University, a private research university in Rhode Island. It is located along the Providence River, down the hill and about a quarter mile from Brown's central campus on College Hill. The School of Public Health grew out of the Department of Community Health at Brown's Alpert Medical School and was officially founded in 2013 as an independent school.

The school offers undergraduate, graduate, doctoral, and certificate programs as well as dual degree programs in conjunction with Brown's Alpert Medical School and Watson Institute for International and Public Affairs. Academics are organized around four departments: behavioral and social sciences, biostatistics, epidemiology, and health services, policy & practice.

Among schools of public health in the United States, the school receives the fourth most funding in NIH awards.

History 
Brown traces its School of Public Health to 1916, when the Corporation established a course of study leading to a Doctorate in Public Health. In 1971, Brown founded the Department of Community Health as a constituent department of the university's Alpert Medical School. The Program in Public Health was relocated from Brown's main campus on College Hill to a downtown location at 121 South Main Street in 2006. Further programs were developed over the subsequent decades, culminating with the establishment of the School of Public Health in February of 2013. The school was awarded CEPH accreditation in 2016.

In 2017, the school established a center for the study of mindfulness. The center draws on experts in the fields of psychiatry, the social sciences, and epidemiology to examine the effects of contemplative practices such as mindful meditation. The Mindfulness Center also offers evidence-based mindfulness training.

Expansion and COVID-19 scholarship 
In 2021 Brown acquired the adjacent property to accommodate future growth of the school. The same year, amid the COVID-19 pandemic, the school saw a 116% increase in applications for its Master's in Public Health Program. Accordingly, the school announced a planned expansion of the program to roughly 90 students.

In August of 2021 the University established the Long Covid Initiative with a $1 million grant from the Hassenfeld Family Foundation. The initiative will compile and communicate research on post-COVID-19 syndrome and develop policy recommendations. The same month, researchers at the school were awarded a $4.9 million grant from the CDC to study the duration of protective immunity offered by COVID-19 vaccines among nursing home residents.

In 2022 the school announced the launch of an online-only Master of Public Health program.

Deans 

Since the school's founding, three individuals have served as deans. Terrie Fox Wetle served as the school's inaugural dean from 2013 to 2017. In 2017. she was succeeded by Bess Marcus who served as dean until 2020. Ashish Jha was appointed the school's third dean in 2020. In March 2022, Jha was selected by Joe Biden to serve as the White House Coronavirus Response Coordinator; during Jha's assignment, Ronald Aubert will serve as interim dean of the school.

In 2021, Megan Ranney was appointed inaugural academic dean of the school.

Academics 
Brown's School of Public Health offers undergraduate, graduate, doctoral, and dual-degree programs.

Two of Brown's undergraduate majors are offered through the School of Public Health: Public Health (A.B.) and Statistics (Sc.B.). The school also offers undergraduate students the opportunity to pursue a Master of Public Health degree during a fifth year. At the postgraduate level, the school offers masters programs in Public Health (MPH), Biostatistics (Sc.M.), and Clinical and Translational Research (Sc.M.). Doctoral (Ph.D.) programs are offered in Behavioral and Social Health Sciences, Biostatistics, Epidemiology, and Health Services Research.

Dual degrees offered by the School of Public Health include an M.D./MPH program offered in conjunction with the Alpert Medical School and a MPH/MPA program offered in conjunction with the Watson Institute for International and Public Affairs.

Rankings 

The Brown University School of Public Health is ranked as the 16th best public health school in the nation by U.S. News & World Report. In 2022 U.S. News ranked Brown's biostatistics program the 13th best in the United States. The Academic Ranking of World Universities ranks the school 15th nationally—tied with the University of Pennsylvania.

In 2021, Niche ranked Brown 3rd—behind Harvard University and Johns Hopkins University—on their list of Best Colleges for Public Health in America.

In 2021, the school received $65,319,136 in NIH awards, the 4th most of any school of public health in the United States.

Notable people

Faculty 
 Judson A. Brewer, Director of Research and Innovation at the Mindfulness Center, and Professor of Behavioral and Social Sciences
 Elizabeth Cameron, Professor of the Practice of Health Services, Policy and Practice
 Lorin Crawford, RGSS Assistant Professor of Biostatistics
 Alison Field, Professor of Epidemiology
 Constantine Gatsonis, Henry Ledyard Goddard University Professor of Biostatistics, Chair of Biostatistics and Founding Director for the Center for Statistical Scientists
 Wilmot James, Professor
 Ashish Jha, Dean, Professor of Health Services, Policy and Practice; White House Coronavirus Response Coordinator (2022–)
David C. Lewis, Professor Emeritus of Community Health, Donald G. Millar Distinguished Professor Emeritus of Alcohol and Addiction Studies
 Simin Liu, Professor of Epidemiology
 Bess Marcus, Professor of Behavioral and Social Sciences and former dean of the school
Peter Monti, Donald G. Millar Distinguished Professor of Alcohol and Addiction Studies and Director, Center for Alcohol and Addiction Studies
Jennifer Nuzzo, Director of the Center for Pandemic Preparedness and Response
Scott Rivkees, Professor of the Practice, Surgeon General of Florida (2019–21)
David A. Savitz, Professor of Epidemiology
Christopher H. Schmid, Chair of the Department of Biostatistics
Ira Wilson, Professor and Chair of Health Services, Policy and Practice

Alumni 
 Khaled Almilaji (2016–17), Syrian doctor and medical humanitarian
Cheryl A. M. Anderson (B.A. 1992), Founding Dean, UC, San Diego School of Public Health
Nicole Alexander-Scott (M.P.H., 2011), Director, Rhode Island Department of Health
Tiara Mack (B.A. 2016), Member of the Rhode Island Senate from the 6th district (2020–)
 Megan Ranney (M.P.H. 2010), Academic Dean, Brown University School of Public Health

References 

Schools of public health in the United States
Medical and health organizations based in Rhode Island
2013 establishments in Rhode Island
Brown University